In Euclidean geometry, Anne's theorem, named after the French mathematician Pierre-Leon Anne (1806–1850) describes an equality of certain areas within a convex quadrilateral. 

Specifically, it states:

If the two sums of areas of opposite triangles are equal:

For a parallelogram the Newton line does not exist since both midpoints of the diagonals coincide with point of intersection of the diagonals. Moreover the area identity of the theorem holds in this case for any inner point of the quadrilateral.

The converse of Anne's theorem is true as well, that is for any point on the Newton line which is an inner point of the quadrilateral, the area identity holds.

References
Claudi Alsina, Roger B. Nelsen: Charming Proofs: A Journey Into Elegant Mathematics. MAA, 2010, pp. 116–117
Ross Honsberger: More Mathematical Morsels. Cambridge University Press, 1991, pp. 174–175 )

External links
Newton's and Léon Anne's Theorems at cut-the-knot.org
Andrew Jobbings: The Converse of Leon Anne's Theorem 

Theorems about quadrilaterals